Matteo Gigante (born 4 January 2002) is an Italian tennis player.

Gigante has a career high ATP singles ranking of 194, achieved on 13 February 2023. He also has a career high doubles ranking of 334 achieved on 6 February 2023.

Career finals

Singles: 3 (2–1)

Doubles: 0 (0–5)

References

External links
 
 

2002 births
Living people
Italian male tennis players
Sportspeople from Rome